Great Wall of China is the sixty-eighth release and twenty-sixth soundtrack album by Tangerine Dream.

Track listing

References

2000 soundtrack albums
Film soundtracks
Tangerine Dream soundtracks